This is a list of the 21 members of the European Parliament for Hungary elected at the 2014 European Parliament election. They serve in the 2014 to 2019 session.

Elected MEPs

Party representation

Midterm changes
 Ildikó Pelczné Gáll became member of the European Court of Auditors, thus resigned on 31 August 2017. She was replaced by Lívia Járóka on 15 September 2017.
 Béla Kovács left Jobbik on 6 December 2017.
 Krisztina Morvai broke her cooperation with Jobbik on 11 April 2018.
 Tamás Meszerics left Politics Can Be Different (LMP) on 22 October 2018.

See also
 Members of the European Parliament 2014–2019 – List by country
 List of members of the European Parliament, 2014–2019 – Full alphabetical list
 2014 European Parliament election in Hungary
 2014 European Parliament election
 Parliamentary Groups

External links 
 European Parliament website

European Parliament